Berezniki is a rural locality (a selo) and the administrative center of Bereznikovskoye Rural Settlement, Sobinsky District, Vladimir Oblast, RSFSR. Russia. The population was 466 as of 2010. There are 21 streets.

Geography 
Berezniki is located 20 km south of Sobinka (the district's administrative centre) by road. Konnovo is the nearest rural locality. ICBM area.

References 

Rural localities in Sobinsky District
Sudogodsky Uyezd